The 4th Brigade Combat Team, 10th Mountain Division ("Patriot Brigade") is an inactive infantry brigade combat team. Based at Fort Polk, Louisiana, the brigade was active from 2005 to 2015. It was a subordinate formation of the 10th Mountain Division.

History

The 4th Brigade Combat Team, 10th Mountain Division (Light Infantry) officially activated at Fort Polk, Louisiana, 19 January 2005. At its inception, the brigade included just a few hundred Soldiers.  However, the Brigade's leadership immediately set to work to rapidly build combat power and capabilities in anticipation of deploying to support the Global War on Terror.
In the midst of preparing for deployment, elements across the brigade provided disaster response and relief within Louisiana to help mitigate the devastating effects of hurricanes Katrina and Rita during the fall of 2005.  The brigade deployed more than 300 Soldiers to New Orleans after Katrina and supported local relief-and-recovery efforts to Fort Polk communities following Rita.
Since January 2006, the brigade has deployed more than six thousand Soldiers.  
Throughout 2006 and 2007, several formations within the brigade deployed and operated in Afghanistan.  The brigade command and headquarters established the first U.S. National Command Element in Kandahar to facilitate the transfer of authority of combat operations to NATO-led coalition allies.
In May 2007, the BCT received orders to prepare for a deployment to Iraq and deployed in November 2007 on a 14-month deployment.  The Brigade operated from two forward operating bases and twenty-two joint security stations and combat outposts. Task Force Patriot assumed responsibility for eastern Baghdad – a heavily urbanized area encompassing 80 square miles and more than 2 million citizens.
The 4th Brigade Combat Team deployed to eastern Afghanistan's Logar and Wardak in October 2010.  Their mission was to conduct population-centric, combined-action counterinsurgency operations, building Afghan National Security Force capability and enhancing the effectiveness of provincial governments to create a more stable environment for transition and to defeat insurgency.
Task Force Patriot deployed once again to Afghanistan in July 2013 when it assumed responsibility for the Train, Advise and Assist mission for the seven provinces of Regional Command – East, North of Kabul from the 1st BCT, 101st ABN DIV and the 4th BCT, 1st CAV DIV.   Task Force Patriot saw the ANSF defeat the enemies of Afghanistan during the first fighting season where they were entirely in the lead to secure the people of Afghanistan.  After the fighting season, Task Force Patriot focused on building sustainable systems in the ANSF that would allow them to be a professional force that is capable of supplying, training, and maintaining itself with Afghan processes and solutions.

Order of battle
While active, the brigade consisted of:
 Headquarters and Headquarters Company (HHC), 4th Brigade Combat Team (4th BCT)
 3rd Squadron, 89th Cavalry Regiment
     *HHT
     *A Troop
     *B Troop
     *C Company
      Attached
     *D Company (Forward Support), 94th BSB
 2nd Battalion, 4th Infantry Regiment
     *HHC
     *A Company
     *B Company
     *C Company
     *D Company
       Attached
     *E Company (Forward Support), 94th BSB
 2nd Battalion, 30th Infantry Regiment
     *HHC
     *A Company
     *B Company
     *C Company
     *D Company
      Attached
     *F Company (Forward Support), 94th BSB
 5th Battalion, 25th Field Artillery Regiment (5-25th FAR)
     *HHB Battery "Regulators"
     *A Battery "Gators"
     *B Battery "Bulldogs"
      Attached
     *G Company (Forward Support), 94th BSB
 Special Troops Battalion (STB), 4th Brigade Combat Team (4th BCT)
     *HHC
     *Signal Company
     *Engineer Company
     *Military Intelligence Company
     *Military Police Platoon
     *Fire Support Coordination Cell 
 94th Brigade Support Battalion (94th BSB)
     *HHC
     *A Company (Supply)
     *B Company (Maintenance)
     *C Company (Medical)
     *D Company (Fwd Spt)
     *E Company (Fwd Spt)
     *F Company (Fwd Spt)
     *G Company (Fwd Spt)

Lineage & Honors

Lineage
Constituted 16 January 2005 in the Regular Army as Headquarters, 4th Brigade Combat Team, 10th Mountain Division, and activated at Fort Polk, Louisiana
Inactivated 24 February 2015 at Fort Polk, Louisiana

Campaign Participation Credit
War on Terrorism: Campaigns to be determined

Decorations
Valorous Unit Award for the period 29 December 2007 - 5 January 2009
Valorous Unit Award for the period 20 July 2011 - 31 July 2011
Meritorious Unit Commendation for the period 28 November 2007 - 29 December 2008
Meritorious Unit Commendation for the period 10 November 2010 - 15 October 2011

References

External links
 Fort Drum and the 10th Mountain Division Home Page  – official site.
 Lineage and Honors Information: 4th Brigade Combat Team, 10th Infantry Division 
 3rd Brigade, 10th Mountain Division official Facebook Page
 https://twitter.com/3_10MTNPatriots
 https://www.flickr.com/photos/97780128@N02/sets/

Mountain 010 04
Mountain 010 04
10th Mountain Division (United States)
Military units and formations established in 2005
Military units and formations disestablished in 2015